Fabian Wesley Forde (born 26 October 1981) is a Barbadian former footballer who played forward. Born in England, he represented Barbados at international level.

Club career
Forde began his senior career at Watford, after playing for the club's academy. On 6 May 2001, Forde made his only first team appearance for Watford in a 2–0 loss against Burnley in the First Division, coming on as an 82nd-minute substitute. During his time at Watford, Forde was loaned out to Enfield and Chesham United, before being released at the end of the 2002–03 season. Upon his release from Watford, Forde signed for Crawley Town in August 2003, before leaving for Grays Athletic and then Hendon in the same year. Forde later played for Chelmsford City, Egham Town, Hemel Hempstead Town, Hampton & Richmond Borough and Windsor & Eton.

International career
In November 2002, Forde played twice for Barbados at the 2002 Central American and Caribbean Games. In September 2003, Forde scored on his debut for Barbados U23 in a 4–1 loss against Guyana U23 in a qualification match for the 2004 Olympics.

Personal life
Forde's son Shaq, is a footballer who currently plays for Watford.

References

1981 births
Living people
Association football forwards
English footballers
English sportspeople of Barbadian descent
People with acquired Barbadian citizenship
Black British sportspeople
Barbados international footballers
Barbadian footballers
Footballers from Harrow, London
Watford F.C. players
Enfield F.C. players
Chesham United F.C. players
Crawley Town F.C. players
Hendon F.C. players
Grays Athletic F.C. players
Chelmsford City F.C. players
Egham Town F.C. players
Hemel Hempstead Town F.C. players
Hampton & Richmond Borough F.C. players
Windsor & Eton F.C. players
English Football League players
Competitors at the 2002 Central American and Caribbean Games